EXIM Bank of Pakistan or Export Import Bank of Pakistan is a Development Finance Institution owned by the Government of Pakistan to stimulate the growth and diversification of the country's exports and assist in the implementation of import substitution plans.

Senate session on Friday, 30th September 2022, approved the bill to establish the Export Import Bank of Pakistan for the promotion of international trade. The motion to pass the bill titled  “the Export Import Bank of Pakistan Bill 2022” was moved by Dr. Aisha Ghous, Minister of State for Finance and Revenue. The bill for EXIM Bank was earlier passed by National Assembly on June 9th, 2022. The Government of Pakistan made a policy decision to set up an EXIM Bank for Pakistan, with a mandate to provide innovative products to support the growth of exports and export led foreign direct investment by mitigating related risks. There are over 60 such agencies in the world, providing similar products to their industry, and this is the first time, the Government of Pakistan is introducing such products in Pakistan, providing an enabling environment and level-playing field to Pakistan based exporters. The enactment of EXIM bank will help improve balance of payment position which is one of the main targets of finance team under Finance Minister Senator Ishaq Dar. The Asian Development Bank and the Islamic Development Bank continue to provide technical support to the EXIM Bank. EXIM Bank headquarters is in Islamabad.  It’s business model is based on partnerships with commercial banks/ international banks and multilateral development agencies as well as Export Credit Agencies around the world.

See also
 List of banks in Pakistan
 Economy of Pakistan
 Foreign trade of Pakistan

References

External links
 Official website

Banks of Pakistan
Banking in Pakistan
Banks established in 2020
Export credit agencies
Development finance institutions
Foreign trade of Pakistan